Alexis Rivera may refer to:

 Alexis Rivera Curet (born 1982), Puerto Rican footballer
 Alexis Marie Rivera (1977–2012), transgender advocate

See also
 Yamilson Rivera (Yamilson Alexis Rivera Hurtado, born 1989), Colombian footballer